Ramakant Yadav (born 1 July 1957) is an Indian politician belonging to the Samajwadi Party, from the Azamgarh (Lok Sabha constituency) in Uttar Pradesh.

Ramakant Yadav had switched from the Samajwadi Party to the Bahujan Samaj Party in 2004 parliament elections, before finally joining the Bharatiya Janata Party in 2008. Samajwadi Party supremo Mulayam Singh Yadav fought Member of parliament election against Ramakant Yadav and was able to win with very low margin. It was challenging and surprising for all political analyzers. This was because of his great bond with people as he has the image of "backward saviour" .
 
He has a brother named Umakant Yadav Yadav, former BSP MP. One of his sons Arun Kumar Yadav is presently the BJP MLA from Phoolpur Pawai in Azamgarh district of Uttar Pradesh. In 2019 he contested from Bhadohi Loksabha seat on the Congress Party ticket but faced humiliating defeat. He got only 25000 votes.

Positions held

External links
 Official biographical sketch in Parliament of India website

References

1957 births
Living people
People from Azamgarh
Lok Sabha members from Uttar Pradesh
India MPs 1996–1997
India MPs 2004–2009
India MPs 2009–2014
India MPs 1999–2004
National Democratic Alliance candidates in the 2014 Indian general election
Bharatiya Janata Party politicians from Uttar Pradesh
Bahujan Samaj Party politicians
Samajwadi Party politicians
Indian National Congress politicians
Politicians from Azamgarh district
Uttar Pradesh MLAs 2022–2027